Whitewater Township is one of the twelve townships of Hamilton County, Ohio, United States. The population was 6,375 as of the 2020 census.

Geography
Located in the western part of the county, it borders the following townships:
Harrison Township - north
Crosby Township - northeast, west of Colerain Township
Colerain Township - northeast, east of Crosby Township
Miami Township - southeast
Lawrenceburg Township, Dearborn County, Indiana - southwest
Miller Township, Dearborn County, Indiana - west
Harrison Township, Dearborn County, Indiana - northwest corner

No municipalities are located in Whitewater Township, although four unincorporated census-designated places lie in the township: Elizabethtown in the southwest, Hooven in the southeast, Blue Jay in the north, and Miamitown in the east.

Name and history
It is the only Whitewater Township statewide.

Government
The township is governed by a three-member board of trustees, who are elected in November of odd-numbered years to a four-year term beginning on the following January 1. Two are elected in the year after the presidential election and one is elected in the year before it. There is also an elected township fiscal officer, who serves a four-year term beginning on April 1 of the year after the election, which is held in November of the year before the presidential election. Vacancies in the fiscal officership or on the board of trustees are filled by the remaining trustees.

See also
Long Island Beach

References

External links
Township website

Townships in Hamilton County, Ohio
Townships in Ohio